Fouad Allag (born 17 April 1985) is an Algerian footballer who plays as a midfielder for RC Relizane in the Algerian Ligue Professionnelle 2 .

References

External links

1985 births
Living people
Association football midfielders
Algerian footballers
NA Hussein Dey players
CS Constantine players
RC Relizane players
21st-century Algerian people